Clifford Heap (14 December 1906 – 1984) was an English professional association footballer who played as a full back in the Football League for Burnley, Thames and Accrington Stanley.

References

1906 births
1984 deaths
Footballers from Burnley
English footballers
Association football defenders
Burnley F.C. players
Thames A.F.C. players
Millwall F.C. players
Accrington Stanley F.C. (1891) players
Clitheroe F.C. players
Tunbridge Wells F.C. players
English Football League players